Winair, an abbreviation of Windward Islands Airways International NV, is a government-owned Dutch airline based in Sint Maarten.  Founded in 1961 by Georges Greaux and Hippolyte Ledee, It has a fleet of seven aircraft serving ten destinations, all within the Leeward Islands group of the Lesser Antilles in the North East Caribbean. It has its headquarters on the grounds of Princess Juliana International Airport.

History 
Windward Islands Airways was founded in 1961 by Georges Greaux with additional investments from Hipployte Ledee, Chester Wathey, Louis Richardson, and a handful of others. The airline needed short takeoff and landing (STOL) aircraft to service certain airports such as Juancho E. Yrausquin Airport on Saba and began flying de Havilland Canada DHC-6 Twin Otters in 1965.  The December 1, 1963 Windward Islands Airways timetable lists flights between St. Maarten and Saba operated with STOL-capable Dornier Do-28 aircraft.

Agreements 

Winair has interline agreements with the following airlines:

 Air Antilles
 Air Caraibes
 Air France
 British Airways
 Caribbean Airlines
 Copa Airlines
 Corsair International
 Delta Air Lines
 KLM
 United Airlines
 Virgin Atlantic
Winair has code share agreements with the following airlines:
 Air Antilles
 Air France
 KLM

Destinations 
Winair operates services to the following scheduled destinations:

Fleet 

The Winair fleet consists of the following aircraft:

Retired 
The airline fleet previously included the following aircraft:

In addition to above previously operated aircraft, according to the December 1, 1963 Windward Islands Airways timetable the airline was operating STOL-capable Dornier Do-28 as well as Piper Apache aircraft.

References

External links

 
 Landing Saba WinAir Twin Otter, Juancho E. Yrausquin Airport (TNCS / SAB) landing video on YouTube
 ✈ Shortest runway in the world ! (HD 1080p) ✔ landing and takeoff video on YouTube

Airlines of the Netherlands Antilles
Airlines of Sint Maarten
Airlines established in 1961
1961 establishments in the Netherlands Antilles